A production coordinator (officially called production office coordinator and abbreviated POC) is a unionized position in stagecraft under the International Alliance of Theatrical Stage Employees (IATSE) and is governed in Los Angeles by Local 871.

The production coordinator serves under the production manager, producer  or UPM to coordinate the various groups and personnel that come together in filmmaking to a movie and video production to make a television show. It is a supervisory  position to the Production assistant staff. The position requires adept organizational skills, resourcefulness and the ability to handle a  multitude of tasks simultaneously under often high-pressure situations. The POC serves as the gatekeeper of company policy  and is usually responsible for ensuring the rest of the production television crew follows the requirements of the Production Company or Studio.

The duties of a POC are often undefined and extremely varied ranging from office manager, to human resources, to controller, to accountant. The POC is one of the only positions with the IATSE (USA and Canada) which no longer has a scale or set wage. The IA bylaws simply state the POC’s wage is “subject to negotiation with the Producer”. Fringe benefits include inclusion with the (USA)industry’s Motion Picture Industry Pension & Health Plans. Currently the production company is required to contribute 60 pensions hours per week, which equates to about 35-percent of the weekly gross wage. Most all POCs are hired an "on-call" weekly status and are basically paid a flat rate per week, no matter how many or few hours they work. Working conditions can vary on the medium (half-hour, hour-long television, reality, live, soap and feature) and daily hours can range from 8- to 16-hour days. The POC is often the first person in the office and the last to leave since they hold the responsibility of tending to the needs of the crew. 

More recent attempts have been made by Local 871 to establish a scale rate for the POCs, but to date all have been unsuccessful.

The union has a relaxed jurisdiction over the position since it does not have an official job description for a POC. It also governs another junior position in the category called Assistant Production Coordinator or APOC, but again since it does not have an official job description in its bylaws, many studios are able to avoid hiring the APOC.

References 

Filmmaking occupations
Road crew
Stage crew
Theatrical occupations
Theatrical management
Television terminology